Taenaris schoenbergi is a species of butterfly in the family Nymphalidae. It is endemic to New Guinea.

Subspecies
Taenaris schoenbergi schoenbergi
Taenaris schoenbergi kenricki Bethune-Baker (West Irian: Angi Lakes)
Taenaris schoenbergi wandammenensis (Joicey & Talbot, 1916) (New Guinea)
Taenaris schoenbergi weylandensis (Joicey & Talbot, 1922) (West Irian: Weyland Mountains)
Taenaris schoenbergi littoralis Rothschild & Durrant (Papua (Hydrographes Mountains)
Taenaris schoenbergi vanheurni Bakker, 1942

References

Butterflies described in 1893
Taenaris
Endemic fauna of New Guinea